Lake Joyce is a lake which lies along the northern side of Taylor Glacier in Pearse Valley, Victoria Land, Antarctica. The lake was studied by the New Zealand Victoria University of Wellington Antarctic Expedition (1963–64) which named it after Ernest Joyce, a member of earlier British expeditions to the area led by Scott (1901–04) and Shackleton (1907–09).

The lake bottom is covered by thick microbial mats, from which rise microbialite carbonate structures.

References

Lakes of Victoria Land
McMurdo Dry Valleys